Marta Russell (December 20, 1951 – December 15, 2013) was an American writer and disability rights activist.  Her book, Beyond Ramps: Disability at the End of the Social Contract published in 1998 by Common Courage Press analyzes the relationship between disability, social Darwinism, and economic austerity under capitalism.  Her political views, which she described as "left, not liberal," informed her writing on topics such as healthcare, the prison-industrial complex, physician-assisted suicide, poverty, ableism, and the Americans with Disabilities Act of 1990.

Biography

Russell grew up in the Mississippi Delta, born into an old Southern family. She was diagnosed with Cerebral palsy as an infant. During her childhood, she underwent numerous surgeries attempting to improve her mobility. The surgeries were without positive results. As a young adult, Russell attended the Memphis College of Art and received a Bachelor of Fine Arts degree. Frustrated with the conservative culture of the South, she moved to Los Angeles, California, in her early 20s to pursue a career in film. Marta attended The American Film Institute (AFI) and worked as a graphic artist, cinematic visual effects artist, and a commercial producer.  A notable visual effects role was as Background Composite Supervisor for the film "Tron" (1982), working in parallel with her then-husband.

Russell's identity as a writer and journalist emerged as her disability progressed and she had to navigate the disability policy netherworld to survive. She became more involved with disability rights groups such as ADAPT. A photographer as well as a producer of audio and visual content, Russell was recognized in 1994 with an award from the City of Los Angeles Commission on Disabilities for her contributions to disability society in the media. Russell was co-producer/correspondent for the KCET Life & Times documentary entitled, Disabled & the Cost of Saying 'I Do''' (1995) which was honored with a Golden Mike Award for Journalism.

Russell has one daughter named Georgia Scheele.

Journalism

In addition to writing for New Mobility, Ragged Edge Magazine, and the Monthly Review, Russell contributed articles to numerous scholarly and policy journals such as the Journal of Disability Policy Studies and the Socialist Register as well as print and online newspapers such as The Los Angeles Daily News. Legacy publications 
In 2016, Routledge Press published an anthology dedication entitled, "Disability Politics in a Global Economy: Essays in Honour of Marta Russell". The book was edited by Ravi Malhotra and numerous authors contributed. In 2018, a paperback edition of the book was released.

A Second Edition of "Beyond Ramps: Disability at the End of the Social Contract" was released in Amazon Kindle digital format in 2016. The new edition features a foreword by Ravi Malhotra.

In 2019, Haymarket Books published a book of Russell's writings entitled "Capitalism & Disability: Selected Writings by Marta Russell". The book was edited by Keith Rosenthal.

 Bibliography 

 Books 

 Capitalism and Disability: Selected Writings by Marta Russell (2019) 
 Beyond Ramps: Disability at the End of the Social Contract (1998) 

 Articles 

 "The Medicaid Kill-Off."  Aug 2005. Monthly Review. "Targeting Disability." 1 April 2005. Monthly Review.
 "Capitalism and Disability" with Ravi Malhotra. 2002. Socialist Register: 38.
 "Backlash, the Political Economy, and Structural Exclusion." 2000. Berkeley Journal of Employment & Labor Law: 21(1). 
 "Disablement, Prison and Historical Segregation." 2001. Monthly Review. 

References

Sources
 Russell, Marta Beyond Ramps: Disability at the End of the Social Contract  Monroe: Common Courage Press, 1998

External links
 "Is the ADA Enough?" Interview fellow disability activist Laura Hershey, originally published Colorado Quarterly Magazine, 2002 http://dljmlight.tripod.com/DL/IsADAenough.htm
 "Dollars and Death," originally published in The Los Angeles Daily News,Sunday April 25, 1999 http://disweb.org/issues/pas/marta1.html
 "Backlash Against the ADA: Reinterpreting Disability Rights" Linda Hamilton Krieger, Editor University of Michigan Press, 2010 http://www.press.umich.edu/2717075/backlash_against_the_ada
 "Disablement, Prison, and Historical Segregation," co-written with Jean Stewart Monthly Review July–August 2001, Volume 53, Number 3 http://monthlyreview.org/2001/07/01/disablement-prison-and-historical-segregation
 "Targeting Disability" Monthly Review April 2005, Volume 56, Number 11 http://monthlyreview.org/2005/04/01/targeting-disability
 "The Medicaid Kill-Off" MR Zine August 15, 2005 http://mrzine.monthlyreview.org/2005/russell150805.html
 "Too Many Human Rights" Feminist International Radio Endeavor, date unknown http://www.fire.or.cr/disabilities/notas/dis-russell.htm
 "Capitalism and Disability" co-written with Ravi Malhotra Socialist Register'' Vol. 38 http://socialistregister.com/index.php/srv/article/view/5784
 "Disablement, Oppression, and the Political Economy" Journal of Disability Policy Studies Fall 2001 vol. 12 no. 2 pp. 87–95 http://dps.sagepub.com/content/12/2/87.short
 "Honoring Marta Russell (1951 - 2013)" Ravi Malhotra 'Solidarity' April 2014 http://www.solidarity-us.org/node/4113

American disability rights activists
American women journalists
Activist journalists
American socialists
1951 births
2013 deaths
20th-century American journalists
Writers with disabilities
20th-century American women writers
People with cerebral palsy
21st-century American women